V. Nagayya (born Vuppaladadiyam Nagayya Sarma; 28 March 1904 – 30 December 1978) also known as Chittoor Nagayya was an Indian actor, singer, music composer, and director known for his works in Telugu cinema, Tamil cinema, and Telugu theatre. Indian film journalist Baburao Patel described Nagayya as "The Paul Muni of India". Nagayya was considered the best character actor in South Indian cinema during 1940s and 1950s. In 1965, he became the first South Indian actor to receive the Padma Shri in Arts from the Government of India for his contributions to Indian cinema.

Nagayya made significant contributions to Telugu cinema, and starred in about two hundred Telugu films. He was a method actor, and his forte was usually playing intense characters, often immersing himself in the study of the real character's traits and mannerisms. His other prominent film roles include the 14th-century poet Pothana in Bhakta Potana (1942), 17th-century saint Tyagaraja in Thyagayya (1946), 12th-century saint Gora Kumbhar in Chakradhari (1948), and Sivaram in the social problem film Naa Illu (1953).

In 1964, Nagayya essayed the 17th-century saint Bhadrachala Ramadasu in the film Ramadasu which he had also co-written, directed and produced. The film won the National Film Award for Best Feature Film in Telugu. Nagayya also starred in about one hundred and sixty films in Tamil, Kannada, Malayalam, and Hindi.

Early life 

Nagayya was born on 28 March 1904 in a Telugu-speaking family in a tiny hamlet near Repalle, Guntur district, Andhra Pradesh. His parents were Ramalinga Sarma and Venkata Lakshmamba. His maternal grandmother adopted him and took him to her native village, Gonugur, near Kuppam and later to Chittoor. He took up studies with a scholarship provided by the Tirupati Devasthanam and took his degree in Chittoor.

After working as a clerk in a government office, Nagayya became a journalist with Andhra Patrika. Mahatma Gandhi and Nehru influenced him and he participated in the freedom struggle (Dandi Satyagraha) in 1930, later going on to work for some gramophone companies including Hutchins as well as attending the Gowhati Congress conclave with S. Srinivasa Iyyengar. He was married to Jaya Lakshmi, but she died giving birth to a daughter a year after. He then married Girija, and she too died due to miscarriage in the eighth month. His first daughter died of an undiagnosed illness. He then participated in long stays at Ramana Maharshi Ashram. He had family in Tirupati who are his brother's (Vuppaladadiyam Subrahmanya Sarma) son, Vuppaladadiyam S. Haragopal and daughters (Late Amruthavalli and Late Kusuma), Lakshmi Narasimha and their children, Vuppaladadiyam Shyam Sundar and Vuppaladadiyam Pavan Kumar.

In his honour, the Chittoor Nagayya Kalakshetram of Arts was established in Chittoor of Andhra Pradesh.

Civilian honours 
Padmashri, Government of India in 1965

Awards 

National Film Awards
National Film Award for Best Feature Film in Telugu (director) – 1964 for Ramadasu

State Awards
Abinava Thyagaraju by the Maharaja of Travancore.
Best Actor Award by the Andhra Film Journalists Association
 Felicitated by a life size statue in Panagal Park, Chennai after his demise.

Filmography

Actor 

Composer and play back singer

Playback singer
Ramadasu (1964)
 Tenali Raman
Gumasta (1953/II) (playback singer and composer)
Naa Illu (1953) (playback singer and composer)
Yogi Vemana (1947) (playback singer and composer)
Thyagayya (1946) (playback singer and composer)
Swargaseema (1945) (playback singer and composer)
Bhakta Potana (1942) (playback singer and composer)
Devatha (1941) (playback singer and composer)
Sumangali (1940) (playback singer and composer)
Viswa Mohini (1940) (playback singer)
Vande Mataram (1939) (playback singer and composer)
Gruhalakshmi (1938) (playback singer)

Director (partial filmography)
Ramadasu (Telugu, 1964)
En Veedu (Tamil, 1953)
Naa Illu (Telugu, 1953)
Thyagayya (Telugu, 1946)

Producer (partial filmography)
Naa Illu (1953)

Writer (partial filmography)
Thyagayya (1946)

References

External links 
 

1904 births
1973 deaths
20th-century Indian composers
20th-century Indian film directors
20th-century Indian male actors
20th-century Indian male singers
20th-century Indian screenwriters
20th-century Indian singers
Film directors from Andhra Pradesh
Film musicians from Andhra Pradesh
Film producers from Andhra Pradesh
Indian arts administrators
Indian male composers
Indian male film actors
Indian male stage actors
Indian theatre directors
Male actors in Hindi cinema
Male actors in Kannada cinema
Male actors in Tamil cinema
Male actors in Telugu cinema
Male film score composers
People from Chittoor district
People from Guntur district
Recipients of the Padma Shri in arts
Screenwriters from Andhra Pradesh
Singers from Andhra Pradesh
Telugu film directors
Telugu film producers
Telugu film score composers
Telugu male actors
Telugu playback singers